The Musei di Strada Nuova in the Italian city of Genoa comprise three museums which together form a single complex, housed in the Palazzo Rosso, the Palazzo Bianco and the Palazzo Tursi, all of which are located along the Via Garibaldi (formerly the Strada Nuova). The Palazzo Tursi is also Genoa's city hall.

The unified collection was founded in 2004 with the decision to create a single visitor route linking all three palaces, all with a single owner. Palazzo Rosso and Palazzo Bianco had already been independent museums since 1874 and 1892 respectively, whilst parts of Palazzo Tursi had been given over to cultural uses since 2004. The route begins with 15th–20th century paintings in the Palazzo Rosso, followed by art produced in Genoa and Liguria by Spanish, Flemish and Italian artists from the 15th century onwards in the Palazzo Bianco, and concludes in the Palazzo Tursi with Antonio Canova's Penitent Magdalene and the ceramic, numismatic and Paganini collections.

Highlights
Gerard David, Cervara Altarpiece
Paolo Veronese, Susannah and the Elders
Caravaggio, Ecce Homo
Bernardo Strozzi, Woman Cooking
Il Cannone Guarnerius
Antonio Canova, Penitent Magdalene

References

External links
Musei di Strada Nuova within Google Arts & Culture

2004 establishments in Italy
Art museums and galleries in Genoa